New Guinea is governed by the nations of Papua New Guinea and Indonesia, which were identified among the top-10 highest priority countries for parrot conservation in the world, due to their parrot diversity, endemism, and threats.

The island of New Guinea is home to 46 native species of parrots, which makes it the third most diverse biogeographic region in parrot diversity, after the continent of South America which harbours about 100 species and Australia which has 57 species. But considering that the area of New Guinea is at least 8 times smaller than these two zones, it makes New Guinea's parrot diversity truly spectacular. New Guinea shares three species of cockatoos and five other species of parrots with neighbouring Australia and other islands. 38 species of parrots are endemic to the island of New Guinea and minor offshore islands.

Although only 7% of the parrot species are threatened in New Guinea, many are very poorly known, and further information may lead to revisions of their Red List status. Most of the threatened species inhabit the satellite islands of New Guinea, with the exception of Pesquet’s parrot (Psittrichas fulgidus), which lives on the mainland.

References